Beilen is a town in the Dutch province of Drenthe. It is a part of the municipality of Midden-Drenthe, and lies about 16 km south of Assen. The old Reformed church is the only remaining truly old building; a large fire destroyed a major part of Beilen in 1820. 

Beilen has a railway station - Beilen railway station.

The biggest employers in Beilen are the former DOMO milk powder factory and the psychiatric hospital GGZ Drenthe. The village is also home to a large distribution centre for the Jumbo supermarket chain. Beilen is also visited by many tourists, as it is located between many forests and National Reserves. Each August the so-called "Wende-aovends" take place in Beilen, featuring activities for children in the shopping center and showcases by local artists at night. 

Until 1998, Beilen was a separate municipality.

Gallery

References

External links

 Official dutch website of the Beilen community along with Westerbork (village) and Smilde.

Municipalities of the Netherlands disestablished in 1998
Former municipalities of Drenthe
Populated places in Drenthe
Midden-Drenthe